Hikmet Vurgun is a Turkish handball coach, academic for physical education and sports and former handball player.

Private life
Hikmet Vurgun married Nilgün Akış, also a handball coach, academic and former handball player.

Academic career
Vurgun graduated from Ege University in İzmir and obtained a master's degree in 2000. Pursuing an academic career, he was employed end 2004 as a research assistant at the same university.

He taught sports coaching in his capacity as assistant professor at the Physical Education and Sports College of the Celal Bayar University in Manisa. In 2014, he was admitted to the faculty of Recep Tayyip Erdoğan University in conjunction with his move to the Ardeşen GSK in Rize.

Player
Vurgun began his sports career as a handball player in İzmir.

Coach

Club
In 2007, Vurgun took part at a coach course of the European Handball Federation.
The same year, he was appointed head coach of İzmir BB GSK's women's handball team. In June 2014, he transferred to the Rize-based team Ardeşen GSK.

National team
After retiring from playing, he continued his sports career as coach. In 2007, he was appointed assistant to Péter Kovács, the  Hungarian head coach of the Turkey women's national handball team. After serving as assistant coach until 2010, he was promoted to the position of head coach of the women's national team, and the manager of the national team.

Works

References

Date of birth missing (living people)
Place of birth missing (living people)
Turkish male handball players
Turkish handball coaches
Handball coaches of international teams
Ege University alumni
Academic staff of Manisa Celal Bayar University
Academic staff of Recep Tayyip Erdoğan University
Living people
Year of birth missing (living people)